Stormont constituencies may refer to:
 Northern Ireland Parliament constituencies, used for the Northern Ireland Parliament 1921–1972
 Northern Ireland Assembly constituencies, used for Northern Ireland Assemblies 1973, 1982, and since 1998